The IMAM Ro.58 was an Italian twin-engined, two-seat monoplane heavy fighter and attack aircraft, a development of the IMAM Ro.57. First flown in May 1942, it was considered a general improvement over its predecessor, mainly due to the substitution of higher power Daimler-Benz DB 601 engines for the Fiat A.74 engines used on the Ro.57. Initially it had many problems and during the maiden flight only the proficiency of the test pilot, Adriano Mantelli, saved the plane.

It was easily recognizable because it appeared to have a long hump over the fuselage (to accommodate two crew members as opposed to one in the Ro.57). The Ro.58 was a twin-tailed aircraft, in layout similar to the Bf 110.

The performance of the aircraft with the DB 601 engines was much better than even many single engine fighters of the time (605 km/h at 5,000 m, 1,500 km endurance, 10,500 m ceiling).

More heavily armed than its predecessor, with five forward-firing MG 151s; three in the nose and two under the belly (the underbelly guns were not present during the first flight tests) and one 12.7 mm rear-facing Breda-SAFAT machine gun.

Tested alongside an Me 410 it was found to be superior, but even so it initially had its share of problems that delayed production. By the time it was refined it was too late for Italy, and there were no resources even for single-engine fighters, much less the more expensive twin-engined ones.

As with the Ro.57, which was not put into production in 1940 or 1941, the Ro.58, better armed and faster appeared only in May 1942, and too late to be produced in any numbers, as Italy surrendered to the Allies in September 1943.

Specifications
One prototype only produced.

See also

References

Bibliography

 
 

Ro.58
World War II Italian fighter aircraft
1930s Italian fighter aircraft
Low-wing aircraft
Aircraft first flown in 1942
Twin piston-engined tractor aircraft